Zulkifli Mohamad Al-Bakri (Jawi: ذوالكفل محمد البكري; born 16 January 1969) is a Malaysian Islamic scholar. He served as Minister in the Prime Minister's Department in charge of Religious Affairs in the Perikatan Nasional (PN) administration under former Prime Minister Muhyiddin Yassin from March 2020 to August 2021. He has served as Senator from March 2020 to March 2023. Prior to his appointments as minister and senator, he served as the 7th Mufti of the Federal Territories from June 2014 to his appointments in March 2020.

Zulkifli is also the founder of Federal Territories Islamic Religious Council's Pondok Moden Al-'Abaqirah, a religious educational institute. On 5 October 2020, he tested positive for COVID-19 after he returned from campaigning in the Sabah state election. He was discharged from Tuanku Ja'afar Hospital in Seremban after his full recovery nine days later.

Honours

Honours of Malaysia
  :
  Commander of the Order of Meritorious Service (PJN) – Datuk (2019)
  :
  Knight Commander of the Order of the Territorial Crown (PMW) – Datuk (2015)
  :
  Commander of the Order of the Defender of State (DGPN) – Dato' Seri (2018)

References

External links

 

1969 births
Living people
People from Terengganu
Malaysian people of Malay descent
Muftis in Malaysia
Government ministers of Malaysia
Members of the Dewan Negara
Sunni Muslim scholars of Islam
21st-century Malaysian politicians
Commanders of the Order of Meritorious Service